The Regional District of Kitimat–Stikine is a local government administration in northwestern British Columbia, Canada. Its administrative offices are in the city of Terrace. The next-largest municipality in the regional district is the District Municipality of Kitimat. The other incorporated municipalities in the regional district are the Village of Hazelton, the District of New Hazelton and the District of Stewart. Unincorporated communities are many, most of them Indian Reserves which are not part of the governmental system of the regional district, which has limited powers relating mostly to municipal-type services. The remote settlement of Dease Lake, formerly in the Stikine Region, was added to the regional district on December 1, 2007. Thornhill is the largest unincorporated community in the regional District with a population of 5000+ residents.

Municipalities
Thornhill unincorporated municipality population 5123

Demographics

Note: Totals greater than 100% due to multiple origin responses.

Notes

References

Community Profile: Kitimat-Stikine Regional District, British Columbia; Statistics Canada

External links

 
Kitimat-Stikine